The Hastings Sinfonia is an orchestra formed by local professional and experienced amateur musicians, based in Hastings, East Sussex, in the United Kingdom. The orchestra was founded in 2012 by British-Argentine composer and artistic director Polo Piatti, is conducted by Derek Carden and led by violinist Peter Fields.

The orchestra performs music that is universally appealing including the old classics, popular works, film and television music, opera highlights and new melodic works and premieres by living composers such as Garry Judd, Simon Proctor, Paul Lewis and performers such a Thomasin Trezise, Howard Southern, among many others.

In addition to their main concerts, the orchestra has performed at numerous community events such as the Hastings Midsummer Fish Fest, Hastings Pirates Day and was one of the orchestras that took part in The Battle of the Somme Centenary in 2017.

References

External links
 

Stunning music from Hastings Sinfonia soloists
Beethoven’s birth remembered in Hastings Sinfonia’s opening concert of 2020 season
Thrilling music at Hastings Sinfonia’s Winter Concert
FIESTA: A Night of Passion
Packed house for Hastings Sinfonia’s winter concert
Hastings Sinfonia | www.larkreviews.co.uk
Hastings Sinfonia, review: St John the Evangelist, St Leonards, February 1
Hastings Sinfonia: Fiesta | www.larkreviews.co.uk
Hastings Sinfonia | www.larkreviews.co.uk
Hastings Sinfonia: Fiesta, review: St Mary in the Castle, Saturday, July 6
76 and 77 - Hastings Sinfonia, St Mary in the Castle, Hastings

English orchestras
Hastings